The MAMA Award for Best Male Solo (남자 가수상) is an award presented annually by CJ E&M Pictures (Mnet).

It was first awarded at the 1st Mnet Asian Music Awards ceremony held in 1999; Lee Seung-hwan won the award for his song "A Request", and it is given in honor of a male artist with the best performance in the music industry.

Winners and nominees

 Each year is linked to the article about the Mnet Asian Music Awards held that year.

Multiple awards for Best Male Artist
As of 2020, four male artists received two or more awards.

3 wins
 Baekhyun

2 wins
 G-Dragon
 Taeyang
 Zico

Gallery

Notes

References

External links
 Mnet Asian Music Awards official website

MAMA Awards